Guerneville is an unincorporated community and census-designated place in the Russian River Valley of Sonoma County, California, United States. The town is historically known for the logging community, formed in the late 1800s. Guerneville is also known for its natural environment, liberal atmosphere, and proximity to wine-tasting and redwood forests. It was founded by the Guerne family in the 1850s.

History

Guerneville is built adjacent to the Russian River. Redwoods grew in the riverbed with such vigor that just a few centuries ago, the valley had the greatest biomass density on the planet, according to local lore.  The local Pomo Indians used the area as a summer camp and called it "Ceola" ( or cee-oh-lay) which meant "shady place."  Except for a large stand of ancient trees preserved in the Fife Creek watershed, now the centerpiece of Armstrong Woods Park, many of the trees were logged in the late 19th century and the early 20th century, giving rise to the first English name for the place – "Stumptown."  Logging in the area boomed after vast amounts of lumber were needed for rebuilding after the 1906 earthquake. The annual town parade still commemorates the old place name by calling itself "Stumptown Days."  The present name Guerneville was introduced to honor Swiss immigrant George Guerne, a local businessman of the 19th century who owned the town's sawmill. By 1870, there was a U.S. Post Office in Guerneville; it was listed by the name "Guerneville". Although locals may be found selling T-shirts that say "Don't call it Guerneyville" (alluding to the "GURN-vil" pronunciation), many have called the town "Guerneyville" in spelling and pronunciation since the 1800s. The extensive redwood forests on the surrounding mountains are less than 200 years old, having been replacement plantings for much of the logging done in the 19th century.

The area became popular with wealthy vacationers from San Francisco and surrounding communities in the late 19th century.  The San Francisco and North Pacific Railroad linked the town to the Ferries of San Francisco Bay in 1877.  Even with the demise of train service in the late 1930s, the area's resorts remained popular with vacationers who came by automobile through the 1950s. A local movie theater, the River, was built near the beach and showed double features throughout the 1950s and 1960s.  The coming of jet airplane travel in the 1960s marked a period of decline for many of the older resorts.  Winter floods in 1964 caused a further decline in business conditions. A renaissance took place in the late 1970s as large numbers of gay entrepreneurs from San Francisco identified the area as a prime recreational destination for weekends.  Many older resorts benefited from increased tourism, and the town's businesses began to thrive.

Geography
Guerneville is located in western Sonoma County, along the Russian River on State Route 116, between Monte Rio to the west and Forestville to the east.

Of that,  is land and  (1.72%) is water.

Climate

Guerneville has cool, wet winters and warm, dry summers, a climate typical of northern coastal California. Although rainfall is rare during the summer months, fog often comes up the river from the Pacific Ocean, producing enough condensation to create "fog drip," which sustains the numerous redwood trees, ferns, and other vegetation.

Measurable precipitation occurs on an average of 73 days each year. The most rainfall in one month was 29.08 in January 1970.

Other nearby cooperative National Weather Service stations are in Occidental, Cazadero, and Fort Ross.

Demographics

2010
At the 2010 census Guerneville had a population of 4,534. The racial makeup of Guerneville was 3,926 (86.6%) White, 31 (0.7%) African American, 68 (1.5%) Native American, 47 (1.0%) Asian, 12 (0.3%) Pacific Islander, 226 (5.0%) from other races, and 224 (4.9%) from two or more races. Hispanic or Latino of any race were 553 people (12.2%).

The census reported that 99.1% of the population lived in households and 0.9% lived in non-institutionalized group quarters.

There were 2,305 households, 407 (17.7%) had children under the age of 18 living in them, 583 (25.3%) were opposite-sex married couples living together, 197 (8.5%) had a female householder with no husband present, 112 (4.9%) had a male householder with no wife present.  There were 175 (7.6%) unmarried opposite-sex partnerships, and 176 (7.6%) same-sex married couples or partnerships. 984 households (42.7%) were one person and 235 (10.2%) had someone living alone who was 65 or older. The average household size was 1.95.  There were 892 families (38.7% of households); the average family size was 2.74.

The age distribution was 643 people (14.2%) under the age of 18, 306 people (6.7%) aged 18 to 24, 1,042 people (23.0%) aged 25 to 44, 1,932 people (42.6%) aged 45 to 64, and 611 people (13.5%) who were 65 or older.  The median age was 48.2 years. For every 100 females, there were 119.8 males.  For every 100 females age 18 and over, there were 119.3 males.

The homeowner vacancy rate was 3.6%; the rental vacancy rate was 7.7%. 56.2% of the population lived in owner-occupied housing units and 42.9% lived in rental housing units.

In 2015, estimated median household income was $44,127, median family income was $53,250 and per capita income was $35,391, according to the 2011-15 American Community Survey (ACS), U.S. Census Bureau.

2000
At the 2000 census, there were 2,441 people, 1,097 households, and 523 families in the CDP. The population density was 743/sq mi (287/km). The racial makeup of the CDP was 87.42% White, 0.70% African American, 1.07% Native American, 0.61% Asian, 0.20% Pacific Islander, 4.51% from other races, and 5.49% from two or more races. Hispanic or Latino of any race were 14.54% of the population.

Of the 1,097 households 22.0% had children under the age of 18 living with them, 28.4% were married couples living together, 14.1% had a female householder with no husband present, and 52.3% were non-families. 34.8% of households were one person and 8.5% were one person aged 65 or older.  The average household size was 2.17 and the average family size was 2.86.

The age distribution was 19.7% under the age of 18, 7.5% from 18 to 24, 30.2% from 25 to 44, 32.3% from 45 to 64, and 10.4% 65 or older.  The median age was 42 years. For every 100 females, there were 108.5 males.  For every 100 females age 18 and over, there were 109.3 males.

The median household income was $37,266 and the median family income  was $45,875. Males had a median income of $32,350 versus $31,429 for females. The per capita income for the CDP was $22,793.  About 13.5% of families and 13.1% of the population were below the poverty line, including 25.6% of those under age 18 and 5.4% of those age 65 or over.

As of 2000 90% of people from Guerneville speak primarily English while 10% do not. Of these, 6% speak Spanish, 1% speak Russian, 1% speak French, 1% speak German, 1% speak Portuguese, less than 1% speak "other West Germanic languages," Tagalog and Thai.

Economy

Tourism
Guerneville includes a plaza in the town center with permanent chess tables, and small shops.  A public beach area along the Russian River is used for fishing, swimming, boating, and sunbathing.

LGBTQ+ community
Guerneville is an LGBTQ+ vacation destination, and hosts an annual Sonoma County Pride Parade and Celebration the first Sunday in June. Guerneville also hosts a Women's Weekend in the summer, and hosts gay bear charity events for the LGBTQ+ community, including Lazy Bear Weekend in late July or early August, and Polar Bear Weekend in mid-January. Guerneville is also home to the Russian River Sisters of Perpetual Indulgence, a chapter of the Sisters of Perpetual Indulgence, which holds entertaining events in various venues along the Russian River, including monthly bingo games.

There are several LGBT-friendly clubs and bars in Guerneville.

Parks and recreation

Places of interest include Armstrong Redwoods State Natural Reserve and the adjacent Austin Creek State Recreation Area, the Russian River with its meandering flow and wildlife, Johnson's Beach, which hosted the Russian River Jazz and Blues festival In the past and provides summer swimming and boating, and the close proximity of the Pacific Ocean.

Government

Education
The Guerneville School District includes the Guerneville School, a K-8 school, established in 1949.

Media
Guerneville/lower Russian River events receive daily coverage by the Santa Rosa Press Democrat "hyperlocal" online Towns section.

Guerneville is the home of non-commercial radio station KGGV-FM, 95.1 MHz, The Bridge.

The Russian River area occasionally appears in local and/or national news due to significant winter flooding, the worst of which occurred in 1986.  Because much of the housing is elevated, thanks in large part to FEMA grants, floods no longer have the impact they once did and recovery for most residents and businesses is much faster than in earlier times.  The effects of floods are mitigated by the extensive upstream floodplain storage capacity of the Laguna de Santa Rosa.

Filmed in Guerneville
Guerneville's older metal truss bridge can be filmed from the newer bridge, and made an appearance in the movie Mumford as a location for people to walk and talk in idyllic settings. The independent film Deep Dark Canyon was filmed in Guerneville. Surrounding communities were also regular filming locations for the 1960s television series Combat!

References

Further reading

External links

Census-designated places in California
Census-designated places in Sonoma County, California
Gay villages in California
LGBT culture in the San Francisco Bay Area